"Pass the Courvoisier, Part II" is a song by American rapper Busta Rhymes, and the fourth single from his fifth studio album, Genesis. The song is the second part of the song "Pass the Courvoisier", another song featured on Genesis, featuring P. Diddy. The second part features Diddy alongside Pharrell Williams.

Music video
The video, inspired by Harlem Nights and Rush Hour 2, featured cameos from Mr. T, Spliff Star, Mo'Nique, Kym Whitley and Jamie Foxx.

Chart performance
The song peaked at No. 11 on the Billboard Hot 100 and No. 16 on the UK Singles Chart.

Charts

Weekly charts

Year-end charts

Release history

References

2002 singles
Busta Rhymes songs
Sequel songs
Songs written by Pharrell Williams
Songs written by Sean Combs
2001 songs
Sean Combs songs
Pharrell Williams songs